Herbert Barber may refer to:
 Herbert Spencer Barber (1882–1950), American entomologist
 Herbert G. Barber (1870–1947), Vermont attorney and politician